The KUR EC3 class, later known as the EAR 57 class, was a class of  gauge  Garratt-type articulated steam locomotives.  The twelve members of the class were built by Beyer, Peacock & Co. in Manchester, England, for the Kenya-Uganda Railway (KUR).  They entered service between 1939 and 1941, and were later operated by the KUR's successor, the East African Railways (EAR).

Class list
The numbers, build dates and names of each member of the class were as follows:

See also
Rail transport in Kenya
Rail transport in Uganda

References

Notes

Bibliography

External links

Beyer, Peacock locomotives
East African Railways locomotives
Garratt locomotives
Kenya-Uganda Railway locomotives
Metre gauge steam locomotives
Railway locomotives introduced in 1939
Steam locomotives of Kenya
Steam locomotives of Uganda
4-8-4+4-8-4 locomotives